Streptomyces aculeolatus is a bacterium species from the genus of Streptomyces which has been isolated from soil from the Tottori prefecture in Japan. Streptomyces aculeolatus produces naphthablin.

See also 
 List of Streptomyces species

References

Further reading

External links
Type strain of Streptomyces aculeolatus at BacDive -  the Bacterial Diversity Metadatabase

aculeolatus
Bacteria described in 1988